The 2020–21 NK Varaždin (2012) season was the club's ninth season in existence and the second consecutive season in the top flight of Croatian football. In addition to the domestic league, Varaždin participated in this season's edition of the Croatian Cup. The season covered the period from 1 July 2020 to 30 June 2021.

Current squad

Transfers

In

Out

Total spending:  0 €

Total income:  115,000 €

Total expenditure:  115,000 €

Competitions

Overview

HT Prva liga

League table

Results summary

Results by round

Matches
The league fixtures were announced on 29 July 2020.

Croatian Football Cup

Player seasonal records
Updated 3 May 2021

Goals

Source: Competitive matches

Clean sheets

Source: Competitive matches

Disciplinary record

Appearances and goals

References

External links

Varaždin